Jean-Jacques Gautier (4 November 1908, Essômes-sur-Marne, Aisne – 20 April 1986) was a French theatre critic, novelist and essayist. A Norman via his father (a pharmacist in Dieppe) and a champenois via his mother, he was elected a member of the Académie française in 1972.

Works 
 L'Oreille, 1946
 Histoire d'un fait divers, prix Goncourt, 1946
 Les Assassins d'eau douce, 1947
 Le Puits aux trois vérités, 1949
 La Demoiselle du Pont-aux-Ânes, 1950
 Paris sur scène, illustrations de Sennep, 1951
 Nativité, 1952
 M'auriez-vous condamné ? 1952
 Maria-la-Belle, 1954
 C'est tout à fait moi, 1956
 Vous aurez de mes nouvelles, 1957
 Si tu ne m'aimes je t'aime, 1960
 C'est pas d'jeu ! 1962
 Deux Fauteuils d'orchestre, 1962
 La Comédie française, 1964
 Un Homme fait, 1965
 La Chambre du fond, 1970
 Une Femme prisonnière, 1970
 Théâtre d'aujourd'hui, dix ans de critique dramatique, et des Entretiens avec Moussa Abadi sur le théâtre et la critique, illustrations de Sennep, 1972
 Cher Untel, 1974
 Je vais tout vous dire, 1976
 Âme qui vive, 1978
 Face, trois quarts, profil, 1980
 Dominique, 1981
 Une Amitié tenace, 1982
 Le Temps d'un sillage, 1985
 Mon dernier livre n'aura pas de fin, préface de Jean-Louis Curtis, 1988
 Il faut que je parle à quelqu'un, 2003

External links 
 Académie française

1908 births
1986 deaths
People from Aisne
Writers from Hauts-de-France
French theatre critics
20th-century French novelists
French male essayists
French male novelists
20th-century French essayists
20th-century French male writers
Members of the Académie Française
Prix Goncourt winners
Burials at the Cimetière parisien de Bagneux